Karla Linke (also Carla; born 29 June 1960) is a retired German swimmer who won the 200 m breastroke event at the 1974 European Aquatics Championships, breaking the world record twice in the process. The following year, she collected two medals at the 1975 World Aquatics Championships: a silver in the 400 m medley and a bronze in the 200 m breaststroke. She also competed at the 1976 Summer Olympics in the 100 m and 200 m breaststroke events and finished eighth and fifth, respectively.

After retiring from competitive swimming in 1977, Linke moved to Sweden and worked for the German-Swedish Chamber of Commerce in Dresden. As of May 2012 she was employed by the Swedish Embassy in Berlin.

References

1960 births
Living people
East German female freestyle swimmers
Olympic swimmers of East Germany
Swimmers at the 1976 Summer Olympics
Swimmers from Dresden
World Aquatics Championships medalists in swimming
European Aquatics Championships medalists in swimming